Sphaceloma coryli is a plant pathogen infecting hazelnuts.

References

External links
 USDA ARS Fungal Database

Fungal tree pathogens and diseases
Hazelnut tree diseases
Myriangiales
Fungi described in 1976